Otherness is a 1995 EP by Scottish alternative rock band Cocteau Twins, released in October 1995 by Fontana Records. It was issued along with Twinlights as a teaser for the full-length album Milk & Kisses. It was the group's final EP.

Production
While it was a companion piece to Twinlights, it was very different in style. Otherness is a remix EP, the only such record released by the band. The remixer and collaborator was Mark Clifford from the British experimental band Seefeel. All of the EP's tracks were also featured on either previous or future releases. Both "Seekers Who Are Lovers" and "Violaine" appeared on Milk and Kisses in totally reimagined versions. "Feet-Like Fins" originally appeared on the 1986 album Victorialand, and "Cherry-Coloured Funk" originally appeared on the 1990 album Heaven or Las Vegas.

Remaster
This EP and Twinlights were digitally remastered and re-released in 2005 as part of Lullabies to Violaine.

Track listing
All songs written by Cocteau Twins, except "Feet Like Fins", which was written by Elizabeth Fraser and Robin Guthrie.

 "Feet Like Fins" – 5:30 
 "Seekers Who Are Lovers" – 5:41 
 "Violaine" – 5:07 
 "Cherry-Coloured Funk" – 5:07

Personnel
 Elizabeth Fraser
 Robin Guthrie
 Simon Raymonde
 Mark Clifford

Charts

References

1995 EPs
Cocteau Twins albums
1995 remix albums
Remix EPs
Fontana Records remix albums
Fontana Records EPs